Wonheung Station is a subway station on Ilsan Line. The Agricultural Cooperative University, Seosamneung, etc. are located nearby this station.

Since Wondang station and Samsong station are 5 kilometers apart, this new midway station was opened on December 27, 2014 in order to solve the problem of traffic inconvenience.

Station layout

Entrance
 Exit 1: Goyang Samsong LH Star Class Apartment
 Exit 2: Public Government Building
 Exit 3: Goyang Agriculture Technology Center
 Exit 4: Seoul Hanyang Country Club
 Exit 5: Seosamneung Hooking Place
 Exit 6: Agricultural Cooperative University
 Exit 7: Samsong Elementary School
 Exit 8: Goyang Samsong Humansia Apartment

References

Seoul Metropolitan Subway stations
Railway stations opened in 2014
Metro stations in Goyang
2014 establishments in South Korea
Seoul Subway Line 3
Railway stations in South Korea opened in the 21st century